Handscapes is a double live album by The Piano Choir featuring Stanley Cowell, Nat Jones, Hugh Lawson, Webster Lewis, Harold Mabern, Danny Mixon, and Sonelius Smith recorded in 1973 and first released on the Strata-East label.

Reception

At the time of release Ebony reviewer Phyl Garland said "One needn't be a "piano freak" to appreciate a truly new recording. First of all imagine seven gifted and talented pianists sitting down to seven grand pianos (with electric piano, organ, harpsichord, a few tambourines for spice) and proceeding to tear up these instruments - musically, that is. ...the torrrent of sound springing from their 70 fingers is so powerful and majestic as to be unlike anything one has ever heard." In his review for AllMusic, Michael G. Nastos simply states "Brilliant".

Track listing
Side A:
 "Jaboobie's March" (Hugh Lawson) - 13:40
 "Straight, No Chaser" (Thelonious Monk) - 6:00
 "Precious Lord" (Thomas A. Dorsey) - 4:50
Side B:
 "Sanctum Saintorium" (Sonelius Smith) - 13:40
 "Nation Time" (Webster Lewis) - 5:40
 "Effi" (Sanley Cowell) - 6:50
Side C:
 "Man Extensions" (Danny Mixon) - 31:25
Side D:
 "The Almoravids" (Joe Chambers) - 15:40
 "Killers" (Stanley Cowell) - 7:30

Personnel
Stanley Cowell, Nat Jones, Hugh Lawson, Webster Lewis, Harold Mabern, Danny Mixon, Sonelius Smith - piano, electric piano, vocals, percussion, African piano, harpsichord

References

1973 albums
Stanley Cowell albums
Strata-East Records albums